The assault on Telephis and Ollaria occurred in 553 during the Lazic War between the Sasanian Empire and the Byzantine Empire.

As the Byzantine position was strengthened by fresh forces, the Sasanian commander Mihr-Mihroe took the initiative and dislodged the Byzantine forces in a surprise offensive westward to the Nesos "island".

Source
The primary source of this conflict is the Byzantine historian Agathias, who seems to have had access to the reports of the inquiry into the defeat.

The campaign
The Byzantines had reinforced the region with a large force under the generals Martin, Bessas, and Bouzes, accompanied by Justin, son of Germanus. Martin stationed at a frontier stronghold guarding a strategic narrow pass at Telephis, while Bessas and Justin stationed nearby at Ollaria. The Sasanian general Mihr-Mihroe had stationed nearby at Kutais. Knowing that he could not defeat the Byzantine force right away, he reportedly spread disinformation by rumoring about himself being critically ill, which caused the Byzantine forces to relax their defenses (he actually died of illness afterward; see below). The following Sasanian assault caused a general retreat of the Byzantines at Telephis, and later Ollaria, westward as far as the stronghold at Nesos "island" (perhaps the Tekhuri–Abasha). Mihr-Mihroe was not able to follow up the victory due to supply problems and lack of siege equipment and retreated to Mocheresis, reinforcing his strategic garrison at Onoguris on his way, and died of illness shortly afterward.

Aftermath
The Lazic king Gubazes soon protested to Justinian about the incompetence of the Byzantine generals, who dismissed some of them.

The Byzantine generals under Martin attempted to capture Onoguris but were defeated by a small relief force under Nachoragan who had just succeeded general Mihr-Mihroe.

References

Lazic War
553
550s conflicts
6th century in Georgia (country)
Battles of the Roman–Sasanian Wars
550s in the Byzantine Empire
6th century in Iran
Telephis
Telephis